Pakistan competed in the 2006 Asian Games held in Doha, Qatar.

Medalists

Kabaddi
Gold Medal Match - December 6

Weightlifting

Football

Squash

  Men's singles - Mansoor Zaman

Wushu
  - Sanshou -65 kg - Syed Maratab Ali Shah

References

Nations at the 2006 Asian Games
2006
Asian Games